Saint-Aulaire is a commune in the Corrèze department in central France. Saint-Aulaire station has rail connections to Brive-la-Gaillarde, Saint-Yrieix and Limoges.

Population

See also
Communes of the Corrèze department

References

Communes of Corrèze